Alfredo Néstor Atanasof (born 24 November 1949) is an Argentine politician, who was National Deputy for Buenos Aires district during three terms 2009–2013, 2003-2007 and 1995–2002. He also served as Chief of the Cabinet of Ministers of Argentina and Minister of Labour during the presidency of Eduardo Duhalde in 2002.

In January 2020 he was designated by president Alberto Fernández as Argentine ambassador to Bulgaria.

He belongs to the Justicialist Party. He was born in La Plata and started his career as a trade unionist in Mar del Plata.

References 

Politicians from Buenos Aires
Living people
People from La Plata
Argentine people of Bulgarian descent
Members of the Argentine Chamber of Deputies elected in Buenos Aires Province
Argentine trade unionists
Chiefs of Cabinet of Ministers of Argentina
Ministers of labor of Argentina
1949 births
Justicialist Party politicians